Plagiocrossa is a monotypic moth genus in the family Lecithoceridae erected by Anthonie Johannes Theodorus Janse in 1954. Its only species, Plagiocrossa picrodora, was first described by Edward Meyrick in 1913. It is found in South Africa.

The wingspan is about 11 mm. The forewings are dark purplish fuscous, with the costal edge whitish ochreous from before the middle almost to the apex. There is a transverse whitish-ochreous bar in the disc at three-fifths. The hindwings are pale whitish ochreous, towards the termen and dorsum tinged with grey.

References

Endemic moths of South Africa
Lecithoceridae
Monotypic moth genera